Illia Salei (born 30 August 1991) is a Belarusian lawyer and political figure, member of Viktar Babaryka's team and presidential campaign office at time of the 2020 Belarusian presidential election. Attorney of presidential candidates Viktar Babaryka and Sviatlana Tsikhanouskaya, as well as an opposition leader and a member of the presidium of the Coordination Council of Belarus Maria Kolesnikova. Recognized as a prisoner of conscience by Amnesty International.

Education
Graduated from Belarusian State University Faculty of Law in 2013 with highest honors. Obtained his Master of Laws from Duke University School of Law in 2014.

Legal career
After graduation, Salei gained practical training at Marks & Sokolov LLC, an American-Russian international boutique firm in Philadelphia and at the international arbitration teams of Wilmer Cutler Pickering Hale and Dorr LLP in London, UK and Freshfields Bruckhaus Deringer LLP in Dubai, UAE. Most of his legal career Salei spent as an associate / advocate at Borovtsov & Salei, an internationally-recognized Belarusian law firm.

2020 Belarusian presidential election
Lawyer and one of the managers of Viktar Babaryka's 2020 presidential campaign office in Belarus.

As a lawyer, provided full legal support to the campaign team of democratic presidential candidates Viktar Babaryka and Sviatlana Tsikhanouskaya at time of the 2020 Belarusian presidential election, as well as to an opposition leader, one of the members of the presidium of the Coordination Council of Belarus Maria Kalesnikava.

Together with Maxim Znak, Salei acting on behalf of Sviatlana Tsikhanouskaya appealed the results of the 2020 Belarusian presidential election to the Supreme Court of Belarus.

Arrest and detention 
On 9 September 2020, Salei was detained by KGB and the Main Directorate for Combating Organized Crime of the Ministry of Internal Affairs of Belarus. He was arrested and charged with threatening the national security of Belarus.

Coalition of Belarusian human rights organizations headed by Viasna Human Rights Centre and Belarusian Helsinki Committee recognized Salei as a political prisoner. Amnesty International deemed Salei a prisoner of conscience.

Law Society of England and Wales and American Bar Association wrote official letters to Alexander Lukashenko and Belarusian authorities demanding immediate release of Illia Salei. Duke Community Members issued a public statement in connection with the arrest calling for release of Illia Salei.

On 16 October 2020, Salei was released from Minsk Pre-Trial Detention Centre No.1 and placed under house arrest. On 16 April 2021, he was released on bail but remained under prosectuion.

On 13 August 2021, Salei announced that he temporary left Belarus for Poland.

Meeting with Alexander Lukashenko

On 10 October 2020, Illia Salei was one of the participants of Alexander Lukashenko's meeting with Belarusian opposition leaders in the KGB Pre-Trial Detention Centre in Minsk.

References 

1991 births
Belarusian lawyers
Belarusian dissidents
Political prisoners according to Viasna Human Rights Centre
Belarusian State University alumni
Duke University alumni
Politicians from Minsk
Belarusian political prisoners
Living people